Young America is a short silent film (1897).

Plot
A couple are love-making in a picturesque garden.  A youngster spoils it all by tying a bunch of fire-crackers to the young man's coat tails, and setting them off, with comedic results.

See also

External links
 

1897 films
1897 comedy films
American silent short films
Silent American comedy films
American comedy short films
American black-and-white films
1897 short films
1890s American films